University Football Club is a Burmese football club, founded in 2009. The Players of this football club are students from universities of Myanmar.

Coaches

Team Manager = U Saw Khaing
Head Coach   = U Zaw Min

Current squad

References

External links
 First Eleven Journal in Burmese
 Soccer Myanmar in Burmese

Association football clubs established in 2009
Myanmar National League clubs
2009 establishments in Myanmar
Football clubs in Myanmar